André-Joël Eboué (born 25 June 1974) is a Cameroonian retired footballer who played as a goalkeeper.

Club career
Born in Yaoundé, Eboué's 17-year senior career was spent mainly in lower league football, his first team being Olympic Mvolyé, and he also represented in his country Tonnerre Yaoundé. Abroad, he represented R.A.A. Louviéroise (Belgium, no games), Sevilla Atlético (Spain), O Elvas CAD, S.C. Freamunde (both in Portugal), A.S. Varese 1910 (Italy), Stade Beaucairois, Blanc-Mesnil SFB, Villemomble Sports and AS Orly (all in France).

Eboué's only professional spell occurred in the 2000–01 season, when he backed up Spaniard Rufino Lekué at Freamunde and the club ranked dead last in the second division. In May 2002, whilst with Varese, he was attacked by a group of 30 hooligans, being inflicted minor injuries.

International career
Eboué represented the Cameroonian under-20 team at the 1993 FIFA World Youth Championship. He was selected by the full side for the 2003 FIFA Confederations Cup, but eventually did not win one single cap.

References

External links

1974 births
Living people
Footballers from Yaoundé
Cameroonian footballers
Association football goalkeepers
Canon Yaoundé players
R.A.A. Louviéroise players
Sevilla Atlético players
Liga Portugal 2 players
O Elvas C.A.D. players
S.C. Freamunde players
S.S.D. Varese Calcio players
Stade Beaucairois players
Villemomble Sports players
Cameroon under-20 international footballers
2003 FIFA Confederations Cup players
Cameroonian expatriate footballers
Expatriate footballers in Belgium
Expatriate footballers in Spain
Expatriate footballers in Portugal
Expatriate footballers in Italy
Expatriate footballers in France
Cameroonian expatriate sportspeople in Portugal
Cameroonian expatriate sportspeople in France